Eilema leia is a moth of the subfamily Arctiinae. It was described by George Hampson in 1901. It is found in the Democratic Republic of the Congo, Kenya, Nigeria and South Africa.

References

leia
Moths described in 1901
Moths of Africa